Deseret Peak is the highest peak in the Stansbury Mountains with an elevation of 11,035 ft. It is located in the Deseret Peak Wilderness area west of Grantsville, Utah and east of Skull Valley Indian Reservation. It is the fourth most topographically prominent peak in the state of Utah.  The site is a popular destination for hikers and backcountry skiers as the area is a contrast of the alpine wilderness with the surrounding desert basin. The trail that leads to the peak is easily accessible from Salt Lake City. The mountain offers views of the Bonneville Salt Flats, the Great Salt Lake, and the surrounding towns and mountain ranges. On a clear day, it is possible to see Mount Nebo, the highest peak in the adjacent Wasatch Mountains.

Access
From Salt Lake City:
Take Interstate 80 west from the city to Exit 88 (Grantsville)
Take Burmeister Road south from Exit 88 to Grantsville's Main Street (Utah State Route 138)
Take Grantsville Main Street west to 200 West, also known as "West Street"
Take West Street south - it will turn south-southwest at the south edge of Grantsville, thereafter being known locally as "Mormon Trail Road"
Follow Mormon Trail Road southwest to South Willow Canyon Road
Take South Willow Canyon Road west to its upper terminus near the top of South Willow Canyon, where parking is available.

From the parking area, there is a 7.4 mile out and back trail that gains 3,595 feet to the summit. The upper portions of the parking lot are closed during the winter months due to snow and it generally opens completely in the month of May.

See also
 List of Ultras of the United States

References

External links

 
 

Mountains of Tooele County, Utah
Mountains of Utah
Wasatch-Cache National Forest